Fertilia [fer-tì-lia] is a frazione (hamlet) in the municipality of Alghero in the province of Sassari, Sardinia, Italy.

History
Fertilia was built by the Fascist government of Italy in the 1930s, after the draining of the marshes which covered the area. It was originally populated by immigrants from north east Italy (Veneto and Friuli Venezia Giulia) and by Istrian and Dalmatian exiles after the second world war. 
Fertilia lies between Fertilia Airport and the city of Alghero.

Frazioni of the Province of Sassari
1936 establishments in Italy
Populated places established in 1936